This is page shows results of Canadian federal elections in the outer parts of Toronto—the area that was the suburban portion of Metro Toronto prior to the 1998 merger.

Regional profile
This region was largely rural until the 1960s, and its then three ridings usually supported the Progressive Conservatives.  In the 1960s and 1970s as it urbanized and its number of seats gradually doubled to seven, it solidly supported the Liberals (Grits) and even gave the New Democratic Party two seats in 1972's tight election.  From 1979 until the 1990s its seat split reflected but slightly exaggerated the national result between the Grits and Tories, with the NDP usually shut out.

By the 1990s, with the large proportion of immigrants in the region and urban growth increasing the region's seats to 13, suburban Toronto, like Ontario as a whole, swung hard to the Liberals. For two decades, suburban Ontario was the Liberals' power base; from 1993 to 2008, Liberal candidates swept the region, making this region to the Liberals what Rural Alberta was to the Conservatives.  In some ridings, the Liberals defeated their closest opponents by margins of 3-1 or more. The NDP had a few pockets of support, as they did in all of southern Ontario. The Conservatives didn't even register on the radar screen at first; the centre-right had been more or less nonexistent in the former Metro Toronto since the Tories lost all of their seats here in 1993.  Even when the Conservatives won minority governments in 2006 and 2008, they were completely shut out in Toronto.

This changed in 2011, when a slight uptick in Conservative support, combined with vote splitting between the Liberals, NDP and Greens allowed the Conservatives to take six seats in the region - including Liberal leader Michael Ignatieff's Etobicoke—Lakeshore riding, albeit in most cases by narrow margins (as few as 26 votes in one riding). Meanwhile, the national surge of NDP support allowed them to take two in eastern Toronto.  However, even though the Liberals only had four of the now 12 seats (reduced from 13 due to population growth elsewhere in Southern Ontario) the Liberals led slightly in terms of popular vote.

The region reverted to form in 2015, as a massive surge in Liberal support allowed the Liberals to win all 14 seats (increased due to intensification, particularly in North York Centre) here en route to taking all of Toronto. In all but one seat (York Centre), the Liberals won by 5,500 or more votes.

Votes by party throughout time

2019 - 43rd General Election 

|-
| style="background-color:whitesmoke" |Don Valley East
||
|Yasmin Ratansi25,29559.81%
|
|Michael Ma10,11523.92%
|
|Nicholas Thompson4,64710.99%
|
|Dan Turcotte1,6753.96%
|
|John P. Hendry5621.33%
|
|
||
|Yasmin Ratansi
|-
| style="background-color:whitesmoke" |Don Valley North
||
|Han Dong23,49550.45%
|
|Sarah Fischer16,50635.44%
|
|Bruce Griffin4,2859.20%
|
|Daniel Giavedoni1,8033.87%
|
|Jay Sobel4821.03%
|
|
||
|Geng Tan†$
|-
| style="background-color:whitesmoke" |Etobicoke Centre
||
|Yvan Baker32,80051.88%
|
|Ted Opitz21,80434.49%
|
|Heather Vickers-Wong4,8817.72%
|
|Cameron Semple2,7754.39%
|
|Nicholas Serdiuk6641.05%
|
|Mark Wrzesniewski (Libert.)2950.47%
||
|Borys Wrzesnewskyj†
|-
| style="background-color:whitesmoke" |Etobicoke—Lakeshore
||
|James Maloney36,06151.88%
|
|Barry O'Brien19,95228.70%
|
|Branko Gasperlin8,27711.91%
|
|Chris Caldwell4,1415.96%
|
|Jude Sulejmani9211.32%
|
|Janice Murray (M-L)1630.23%
||
|James Maloney
|-
| style="background-color:whitesmoke" |Etobicoke North
||
|Kirsty Duncan26,38861.44%
|
|Sarabjit Kaur9,52422.18%
|
|Naiima Farah4,65410.84%
|
|Nancy Ghuman1,0802.51%
|
|Renata Ford1,1962.78%
|
|Sudhir Mehta (CFF)1040.24%
||
|Kirsty Duncan
|-
| style="background-color:whitesmoke" |Humber River—Black Creek
||
|Judy Sgro23,18761.09%
|
|Iftikhar Choudry6,16416.24%
|
|Maria Augimeri7,19818.96%
|
|Mike Schmitz8042.12%
|
|Ania Krosinska4021.06%
|
|Christine Nugent (M-L)890.23%Stenneth Smith (UPC)1140.30%
||
|Judy Sgro
|-
| style="background-color:whitesmoke" |Scarborough—Agincourt
||
|Jean Yip21,11550.50%
|
|Sean Hu15,49237.05%
|
|Larisa Julius3,6368.70%
|
|Randi Ramdeen1,0502.51%
|
|Anthony Internicola5211.25%
|
|
||
|Jean Yip
|-
| style="background-color:whitesmoke" |Scarborough Centre
||
|Salma Zahid25,69555.19%
|
|Irshad Chaudhry10,38722.31%
|
|Faiz Kamal5,45211.71%
|
|Dordana Hakimzadah1,3362.87%
|
|Jeremiah Vijeyaratnam1,1622.50%
|
|John Cannis (Ind.)2,5245.42%
||
|Salma Zahid
|-
| style="background-color:whitesmoke" |Scarborough—Guildwood
||
|John McKay26,12361.12%
|
|Quintus Thuraisingham9,55322.35%
|
|Michelle Spencer4,80611.24%
|
|Tara McMahon1,2202.85%
|
|Jigna Jani6481.52%
|
|Stephen Abara (Ind.)700.16%Farhan Alvi (CFF)550.13%Kevin Clarke (Ind.)1120.26%Kathleen Marie Holding (Ind.)700.16%Gus Stefanis (CNP)850.20%
||
|John McKay
|-
| style="background-color:whitesmoke" |Scarborough North
||
|Shaun Chen20,91153.57%
|
|David Kong11,83830.33%
|
|Yan Chen5,03912.91%
|
|Avery Velez7962.04%
|
|Jude Guerrier3700.95%
|
|Janet Robinson (UPC)830.21%
||
|Shaun Chen
|-
| style="background-color:whitesmoke" |Scarborough—Rouge Park
||
|Gary Anandasangaree31,36062.19%
|
|Bobby Singh10,11520.06%
|
|Kingsley Kwok5,80111.50%
|
|Jessica Hamilton2,3304.62%
|
|Dilano Sally4670.93%
|
|Mark Theodoru (CHP)3530.70%
||
|Gary Anandasangaree
|-
| style="background-color:whitesmoke" |Scarborough Southwest
||
|Bill Blair28,96557.20%
|
|Kimberly Fawcett Smith10,50220.74%
|
|Keith McCrady7,86515.53%
|
|Amanda Cain2,4774.89%
|
|Italo Erastostene5901.17%
|
|Simon Luisi (Animal)2360.47%
||
|Bill Blair
|-
| style="background-color:whitesmoke" |Willowdale
||
|Ali Ehsassi22,28249.00%
|
|Daniel Lee16,45236.18%
|
|Leah Kalsi4,2319.31%
|
|Sharolyn Vettese1,6713.67%
|
|Richard Hillier5631.24%
|
|Birinder Singh Ahluwalia (Ind.)2000.44%Shodja Ziaian (Ind.)710.16%
||
|Ali Ehsassi
|-
| style="background-color:whitesmoke" |York Centre
||
|Michael Levitt21,68050.20%
|
|Rachel Willson15,85236.71%
|
|Andrea Vásquez Jiménez4,2519.84%
|
|Rebecca Wood1,4033.25%
|
|
|
|
||
|Michael Levitt
|}

2015 - 42nd General Election

2011 - 41st General Election

2008 - 40th General Election

2006 - 39th General Election

2004 - 38th General Election

Maps 

Don Valley East
Etobicoke Centre
Etobicoke-Lakeshore
Etobicoke North
Scarborough-Agincourt
Scarborough Centre
Scarborough-Guildwood
Scarborough-Rouge River
Scarborough Southwest
Willowdale
York West
York Centre

2000 - 37th General Election

Canadian federal election results in Ontario
Politics of Toronto